Sky Racket may refer to:

Sky Racket (1937 film)
Sky Racket (video game)